Debakunda or Devkund is naturally created pond located in the Mayurbhanj district of Odisha, India, and is part of the Simlipal National Park. The flowing water from an adjacent waterfall has created this pond. There is a temple called "Ambika Mandira" that was discovered by Rajkumar Prafulla Chandra Bhanja Deo, a researcher and a king during British Raj who stayed at Devkund and researched about this place. Debakunda is home to lichen species like Parmeliaceae.

Location 
Devkund is located at a distance of 50 KM from Udala, 60 km from Baripada and 66 km from Balasore railway station.

Etymology 
Devkund is combination of two Odia words "Deba" (deity) and "Kunda" (a small pond or tub].

References

External links
 Tourists Places in Odisha

Mayurbhanj district
Tourist attractions in Odisha